Pertusaria salazinica is a species of crustose lichen in the family Pertusariaceae. Found in Australia, it was described as a new species in 2017 by lichenologists Alan Archer and John Alan Elix. Here, in a montane rainforest, it was found growing on a rotting log. The specific epithet refers to the presence of salazinic acid, a major secondary compound in the lichen. It also contains norstictic acid as a major metabolite, and connorstictic acid as a minor metabolite. Pertusaria salazinica is only known from the type specimen.

See also
List of Pertusaria species

References

salazinica
Lichen species
Lichens described in 2017
Lichens of Australia
Taxa named by Alan W. Archer
Taxa named by John Alan Elix